Séraphin Ferrer (5 August 1931 – 21 February 2001) was a French boxer. He competed in the men's lightweight event at the 1952 Summer Olympics.

References

External links
 

1931 births
2001 deaths
French male boxers
Olympic boxers of France
Boxers at the 1952 Summer Olympics
People from Tlemcen
Lightweight boxers